West Milwaukee is a village in Milwaukee County, Wisconsin, United States, which is located in the center of the county approximately a mile south of American Family Field. The population was 4,114 at the 2020 census.

History

The village was incorporated in 1906 to provide low taxes for industry.

Geography
West Milwaukee is located at  (43.014564, -87.973469).

Demographics

2010 census
As of the census of 2010, there were 4,206 people, 1,979 households, and 856 families living in the village. The racial makeup of the village was 69.4% White, 10.2% African American, 0.8% Native American, 3.2% Asian, 12.1% from other races, and 4.3% from two or more races. Hispanic or Latino of any race were 25.4% of the population.

There were 1,979 households, of which 25.7% had children under the age of 18 living with them, 25.7% were married couples living together, 12.5% had a female householder with no husband present, 5.1% had a male householder with no wife present, and 56.7% were non-families. 45.6% of all households were made up of individuals, and 9.3% had someone living alone who was 65 years of age or older. The average household size was 2.12 and the average family size was 3.14.

The median age in the village was 34.7 years. 22.3% of residents were under the age of 18; 8.8% were between the ages of 18 and 24; 32.8% were from 25 to 44; 26.4% were from 45 to 64; and 9.6% were 65 years of age or older. The gender makeup of the village was 52.0% male and 48.0% female.

2000 census

As of the census of 2000, there were 4,201 people, 2,059 households, and 891 families living in the village. The population density was 3,722.0 people per square mile (1,435.4/km2). There were 2,197 housing units at an average density of 1,946.5 per square mile (750.7/km2). The racial makeup of the village was 83.58% White, 3.50% African American, 1.55% Native American, 2.55% Asian, 0.07% Pacific Islander, 5.86% from other races, and 2.90% from two or more races. Hispanic or Latino of any race were 12.00% of the population.

There were 2,059 households, out of which 22.0% had children under the age of 18 living with them, 27.5% were married couples living together, 10.5% had a female householder with no husband present, and 56.7% were non-families. 46.1% of all households were made up of individuals, and 13.4% had someone living alone who was 65 years of age or older. The average household size was 2.03 and the average family size was 2.96.

In the village, the population was spread out, with 20.8% under the age of 18, 10.3% from 18 to 24, 34.8% from 25 to 44, 20.2% from 45 to 64, and 13.9% who were 65 years of age or older. The median age was 36 years. For every 100 females, there were 103.7 males. For every 100 females age 18 and over, there were 103.8 males.

The median income for a household in the village was $35,250, and the median income for a family was $43,036. Males had a median income of $34,135 versus $23,234 for females. The per capita income for the village was $18,396. About 7.5% of families and 11.6% of the population were below the poverty line, including 9.1% of those under age 18 and 23.0% of those age 65 or over.

Property Taxes
As of 2018, Wisconsin had some of the highest property taxes in the country. The state's average effective property tax rate is 1.96%, (median real estate taxes paid: $3,257) the ninth highest average of any state in the U.S. As of 2016 West Milwaukee was the ninth highest taxed ($32.38 per $1000 of assessed value) municipality in the state of Wisconsin.

Education 
West Milwaukee is served by the West Allis – West Milwaukee School District. Schools within the village's boundaries include:
 Pershing Elementary School
 West Milwaukee Intermediate School (formerly West Milwaukee High School)
 West Milwaukee also has one private school:
 Cristo Rey Jesuit High School (formerly St. Florian's Parish School)

Recreation 

West Milwaukee has three parks: West Milwaukee Park, Centennial Park and Lions Park. West Milwaukee park is the largest park in the village with an area of 21.1 acres. It has a walking or jogging track, a wading pool, a children's play center and two baseball diamonds.

References

External links

 

Villages in Milwaukee County, Wisconsin
Villages in Wisconsin